The Drochtersen Shot Tower is a  shot tower at Drochtersen, Lower Saxony, Germany. The Drochtersen Shot Tower is property of the "Jagd-Schrot & Hagel-Fabrik Häntler & Natermann" but it is not in use any more.

See also
List of towers

Shot towers
Buildings and structures in Stade (district)
Towers in Germany